Luca Mazzoni (born 29 March 1984 in Livorno) is an Italian football goalkeeper. He last played for Livorno.

Career

Livorno
After many year as backups, for Alfonso De Lucia (2008–2011), Francesco Bardi (2011–12) and Vincenzo Fiorillo (2012–13), Mazzoni was signed by Calcio Padova in a temporary deal in 2013. In 2014 Mazzoni returned to Livorno as the first choice. Mazzoni and Livorno agreed to terminate the contract in 2015.

Ternana
In 2015 Mazzoni was signed by Ternana in a 1+1 year contract, replacing Alberto Brignoli.

Back to Livorno
He returned to Livorno in 2016, as the first choice goalkeeper during the club's two Serie C campaigns, with the latter ending with promotion to Serie B. He was successively confirmed in his role for the 2018–19 Serie B season, but was suspended by the Italian Football Federation on 6 March 2019 after being found positive to cocaine following a routine drug test. On 23 July 2019 he was formally banned for four years from any football activities.

References

External links
Profile at lega-calcio.it

1984 births
Living people
Italian footballers
U.S. Livorno 1915 players
F.C. Pavia players
Calcio Lecco 1912 players
S.S. Arezzo players
Calcio Padova players
Ternana Calcio players
Association football goalkeepers
Serie A players
Serie B players
Sportspeople from Livorno
Serie C players
Footballers from Tuscany